The 2000 World Ringette Championships (2000 WRC) was an international ringette tournament and the 5th (X) official World Ringette Championships. The tournament was organized by the International Ringette Federation (IRF) and was contested in Espoo and Lahti in Finland, between November 15–18, 2000.

Overview
Participating teams in the 2000 WRC included Team Canada, Team Finland, Team Sweden, and Team USA. All games used three periods for their playing format.

Team Finland and Team Canada played a two-game world championship final. The first final was played on November 15, 2020, in Lahti, and the second final was played on November 18, 2000, in Espoo. Finland won the first game in Lahti with a score of 5-4. In Espoo, Team Canada and Team Finland faced each other for the second time which final which was the deciding match. Finland tied the Canadians with a final score of 5-5 (3-2, 1-1, 1-2). Finland became the world champion with a combined score of 3-1 points while Canada failed to win the world title by finishing in second place. In the bronze medal match, Team USA defeated Team Sweden 9–0.

Venue

Venues were is Espoo and Lahti, Finland.

Teams

Final standings

Rosters

Team Finland
The 2000 Team Finland team included the following:

Team Canada
The 2000 Team Canada team included the following:

See also
 World Ringette Championships
 International Ringette Federation
  Canada national ringette team
  Finland national ringette team
  Sweden national ringette team
  United States national ringette team

References

World Ringette Championships
Ringette
Ringette competitions